Wulin may refer to:

 Wulin is the fictional society of Chinese martial arts heroes in Wuxia fiction. Wulin is considered a part of the broader term jianghu, which refers to the underworld of bandits and other elements that live outside the mainstream of Chinese society.
 Wulin, the ancient name of Hangzhou, China, and Wulin School, a school of Ming dynasty painting in the area
 Wulin Academy of Arts (武林書畫院), a research institution in Hangzhou
 Wulin Square (武林廣場), a public square in the centre of Hangzhou
 Wulin, Guangxi (武林镇), a town in Pingnan County, Guangxi, China
 Wulin, Heilongjiang (五林镇), a town in Yangming District, Heilongjiang, China
 Wulin, Hubei (乌林镇), a town in Honghu, Hubei

See also
 Wuling (disambiguation)